Vasum armatum, common name the helmet vase, is a species of medium to large sea snail, a marine gastropod mollusk in the family Turbinellidae.

Distribution
This marine species occurs off French Polynesia

Shell description
The shell is yellowish white and black, variegated, stained and irregularly banded. The outer lip usually black-bordered within.

References

External links
 Broderip, W. J. (1833). Characters of new species of Mollusca and Conchifera, collected by Mr. Cuming. Proceedings of the Zoological Society of London. 1: 4-8.

armatum
Gastropods described in 1833